Schreyer is a surname of German origin which may refer to:

A. M. Schreyer - American daredevil cyclist and athlete
Adolf Schreyer - German painter
Cindy Schreyer - American golfer
Dirk Schreyer - German rower
Edward Schreyer - Canadian politician
Frank-Olaf Schreyer - German mathematician
Fred Schreyer - American bowling official
Helmut Schreyer - German inventor
Lily Schreyer - Canadian Viceregal Consort
Lothar Schreyer - German artist
Lynn Schreyer - American mathematician
Michaele Schreyer - German European Commissioner
Peter Schreyer - German auto designer
Wolfgang Schreyer - German writer

See also 

 Schreier
 Shrayer
 Shroyer 

German-language surnames